Zephyrarchaea mainae is a species of spider, informally known as Main's assassin spider, Albany assassin spider, and the Western archaeid spider. The first of the assassin spider family (Araneae, Archaeidae) found in Western Australia, the species was unknown until its collection at Torndirrup National Park near Albany was published in 1987.

Taxonomy
Formally described as Austrarchaea mainae by Norman Platnick in 1991, the spider was nominated as the type species for the Australian endemic genus Zephyrarchaea. This split from the more widely distributed Austrarchaea was published in 2012, after further specimens were found and collected in nearby areas, along with several other related archaeid species discovered in the region. The spider's distinction as a species is supported by comparative study of genotyped species of archaeids, as is the low mobility and specialised habitat of populations.

Description 
A species of Archaeidae (assassin spider) around three millimetres long. One distinguishing characteristic is the presence of six humps on the upper side of the abdomen, not found on any species of Zephyrarchaea but the nearby and closely related Zephyrarchaea janineae; these tubercles are arranged in three pairs. The feature is reduced in collections of the Eastern population near Bremer, suggesting they are an emergent species.

Distribution  
Found only near the southern coast of Southwest Australia, a biodiversity hotspot, the species is listed as ‘Threatened’ under the Western Australian Wildlife Conservation Act 1950.

The range centres on  Torndirrup south of Albany, to the Walpole-Nornalup National Park in the west and eastward to Bremer Bay. The population also occurs inland near the Porongurup range.
Zephyrarchaea mainae is restricted to a high rainfall, near coastal habitat of heathland or forest. Most often associated with bushland dominated by Agonis flexuosa (weeping peppermint), or low shrubs, an outlying population has been collected in karri forest.

Habitat 
The habitat within the wider range of Z. mainae is restricted to particular assemblages of flora, which the understory of sedges, Lepidosperma gladiatum and Lepidosperma effusum, and other grasses such Empodisma gracillimum form an elevated and complex crown of leaf and branch litter. The habitat is vulnerable to changes in fire regimes, and the species occurs only when it has remained unburnt for many decades.

References 

Archaeidae
Spiders described in 2012
Spiders described in 1991
Spiders of Australia
Endemic fauna of Australia